Tobías Elián Reinhart (born 21 May 2000) is an Argentine professional footballer who plays as a forward for Temperley.

Career
Reinhart, after joining their academy in 2009, made the breakthrough into senior football with Temperley. He featured twice early on in the 2018–19 season, coming off the bench in a Copa Argentina tie in July 2018 versus Estudiantes and in Primera B Nacional against Gimnasia y Esgrima in August. His first start arrived in the succeeding December during a goalless draw away to Defensores de Belgrano. In August 2019, Reinhart was signed by Italian Serie B outfit Spezia on loan. He was soon assigned to their youth team in Campionato Primavera 2. In November 2019, he began to be regularly called up to the senior squad. On 26 December 2019, he made his Serie B debut when he played full game against Virtus Entella. El 19 de febrero en un partido por la Copa Argentina marcó su primer gol como profesional y con la camiseta de CA Temperley ante Club Atlético Talleres de Remedios de Escalada marcando el tercer gol del partido el cual finalizaría 4-0 en favor de su equipo.

Career statistics
.

References

External links

2000 births
Living people
People from Lomas de Zamora
Argentine footballers
Association football forwards
Argentine expatriate footballers
Expatriate footballers in Italy
Argentine expatriate sportspeople in Italy
Primera Nacional players
Club Atlético Temperley footballers
Spezia Calcio players
Serie B players
Sportspeople from Buenos Aires Province
Argentine people of German descent